Stellar envelope may mean:

 The region of a star that transports energy from the stellar core to the stellar atmosphere
 Common envelope in a binary system